New Earth may refer to:

Books 
 A New Earth: Awakening to Your Life's Purpose, a book by Eckhart Tolle
 "New Earth", the destination planet of Alpha Centauri featured in the sci-fi novel series First Ark to Alpha Centauri by A. Ahad
 Star Trek: New Earth, a series of Star Trek: The Original Series novels

Media 

 New Earth (film) (Dutch: Nieuwe Gronden), 1934 documentary film by Joris Ivens
 New Earth (DC Comics)
 The current primary Earth in the DC Comics Universe; see Multiverse (DC Comics)
 "New Earth" (Doctor Who), an episode of Doctor Who
 The destination of the post-nuclear Earth colony in The Time Travelers (1964 film)

Other uses 
 Mass Effect: New Earth, amusement park ride at California's Great America
 New Earth (Christianity)
 New Earth Records, German record label

es:Nueva Tierra
ru:Новая Земля